Condé-en-Normandie is a commune in the department of Calvados, northwestern France. The municipality was established on 1 January 2016 by merger of the former communes of Condé-sur-Noireau (the seat), La Chapelle-Engerbold, Lénault, Proussy, Saint-Germain-du-Crioult and Saint-Pierre-la-Vieille.

Population

See also 
Communes of the Calvados department

References 

Communes of Calvados (department)
Populated places established in 2016
2016 establishments in France